Dorcadion subcinctellum is a species of beetle in the family Cerambycidae. It was described by Breuning in 1962.

References

subcinctellum
Beetles described in 1962